Ed R. Levin County Park is the largest park in Milpitas, California. It is run by the Santa Clara County Parks and Recreation Department and is located in the chaparral and grassland foothills of Diablo Range east of the Santa Clara Valley. Monument Peak can be accessed through trails in the park. The park's recreational facilities include a hang gliding and paragliding area, a dog park, and horseback riding areas.
Ed R. Levin County Park has two lakes, Sandy Wool Lake and Spring Valley Pond. Both of them are reservoirs which collect runoff water from the hills to the east. It is home to some of the East Bay Walls.
The park is named after open space advocate and Santa Clara County 3rd District Supervisor Edgar R. Levin (1908-1965).

Gallery

References

External links
 Ed R. Levin County Park Official Website

County Parks in Santa Clara County, California
Diablo Range
Dog parks in the United States
Milpitas, California
Regional parks in California
Hang gliding sites
Gliding in the United States
Bay Area Ridge Trail